Bangaram primarily refers to:

 Bangaram Atoll in the Lakshadweep archipelago of India

Bangaram may also refer to:
 Bangaram (film) a Telugu language film
 Bangaram class patrol vessels of the Indian Navy
 , the lead vessel of the Bangaram class patrol vessels